Rafael Khakimov (born June 4, 1990) is a Russian professional ice hockey goaltender. He is currently playing with Neftyanik Almetievsk of the Supreme Hockey League (VHL).

Khakimov made his Kontinental Hockey League debut playing with Metallurg Novokuznetsk during the 2014–15 KHL season.

References

External links

1990 births
Living people
Metallurg Novokuznetsk players
HC Neftekhimik Nizhnekamsk players
Russian ice hockey goaltenders
Salavat Yulaev Ufa players
Sportspeople from Ufa
Severstal Cherepovets players
Toros Neftekamsk players